Mrs. Eckdorf in O'Neill's Hotel is a novel written by William Trevor, first published by The Bodley Head in 1969.

The book was shortlisted for the Booker Prize in 1970.

Plot summary
Mrs Ivy Eckdorf, a professional photographer with two unsuccessful marriages behind her, decides to visit Dublin's O'Neill's Hotel, after hearing that there are some dark secrets in the closet at the place. The hotel is owned by Mrs Sinnott, a compassionate deaf-and-dumb lady fast approaching her ninety-second year. Her feckless son Eugene, a drunk and gambling addict, spends little on the upkeep of the hotel, and the place has now acquired a reputation as a somewhat seedy establishment: Morrissey, a local pimp, often arranges his clients' rendezvous with prostitutes in the rooms. With her feistiness and indefatigable spirit Mrs Eckdorf budges into the lives of the Sinnott family, O'Shea the hall porter and Father Hennessey, a Catholic priest of the local parish.

1969 novels
Works by William Trevor
The Bodley Head books
Novels set in Dublin (city)